Matin Bek (born in 1987 in Hazar Sumuch District, Takhar Province), also known as Abdul Matin Beyk, was the Chief of Staff to President of Afghanistan Ashraf Ghani.

Early life and education 
He was born in Takhar province in 1987. He has a bachelor's degree from Delhi University and a master's degree in political science from Jawaharlal Nehru University. He was one of 29 children his father had with his 4 wives.

Political career 
Bek has worked as an adviser to the Ministry of Interior Affairs and to the deputy head of National Directorate of Security for provinces. 

In 2017 Bek was appointed chairman of the Independent Directorate of Local Governance (IDLG). In this role he focused on developing a merit based model of appointing governors rather than the patronage based network and also worked on women's rights.  He was a member of the negotiating committee between the Islamic Republic of Afghanistan and the Taliban. 

He was a strong supporter of ousted president Ashraf Ghani following on from the Fall of Kabul Bek later said he wished he had not supported Ghani, saying, “I had lost my father, members of my family, and I dreamt a united and developed country and was struggling for my dream Afghanistan..Today I realized that I was deceived and betrayed.”

Media 
He was interviewed for the BBC documentary Afghanistan: Getting Out.

Personal life 
His wife is Adela Raz. She was the Afghan Ambassador of Afghanistan to the United States from 26 July 2021–18 February 2022.  They starred in a BBC World Service Podcast together.

Bek's father Abdul Motalib Bek was a Tajik tribal leader and member of parliament, old anti-Soviet Mujahid of the United Front, but on 25 December, 2011 was killed by a suicide bomber of Taliban.

References

External links
 

Living people
1987 births
Delhi University alumni
Jawaharlal Nehru University alumni
21st-century Afghan politicians